Helina impuncta is a fly in the family Muscidae. It is found in the Palearctic.

References

External links
D'Assis Fonseca, E.C.M, 1968 Diptera Cyclorrhapha Calyptrata: Muscidae Handbooks for the Identification of British Insects pdf

Muscidae
Diptera of Europe
Insects described in 1825
Taxa named by Carl Fredrik Fallén